Frigento is a town and comune in the province of Avellino, Campania, Italy. It is located in the Ansanto valley and bordered by the municipalities of Carife, Flumeri, Gesualdo, Grottaminarda, Guardia Lombardi, Rocca San Felice, Sturno, and Villamaina. Its name derives from the Latin word frequentia ("frequency").

References

External links
Official website

Cities and towns in Campania